Åndalsnes Idrettsforening is a Norwegian sports club from Åndalsnes, Møre og Romsdal. It has sections for association football, team handball, floorball, gymnastics, track and field and skiing.

It was founded on 25 May 1917.

The men's football team currently plays in the Third Division, the fourth tier of Norwegian football. It last played in the Norwegian Second Division in 1998. It last played in the Norwegian First Division in 1995.

Recent seasons

Men

Women

References

 Official site 

Football clubs in Norway
Sport in Møre og Romsdal
Association football clubs established in 1917
Athletics clubs in Norway
1917 establishments in Norway